
This is a timeline of Argentine history, comprising important legal and territorial changes and political events in Argentina and its predecessor states.  To read about the background to these events, see History of Argentina.  See also the list of presidents of Argentina.

 Millennia: 1st BC1st–2nd3rd

Centuries: 5th BC4th BC3rd BC2nd BC1st BC

5th century BC

1st century BC 

 Centuries: 1st2nd3rd4th5th6th7th8th – 9th – 10th – 11th – 12th – 13th – 14th – 15th – 16th – 17th – 18th – 19th – 20th

1st century

6th century

9th century

15th century

16th century

17th century

18th century

19th century 
{| class="wikitable" width="100%"
! style="width:6%" | Year || style="width:10%" | Date || Event
|-
| 1806 || || British invasions of the Río de la Plata unsuccessfully attempt to establish control over Spain's southern colonies as part of the Napoleonic Wars. Spanish troops offer no defence but British repelled by local civilians and militias (to 1807)
|-
| rowspan="7" valign="top" | 1810 || || Secret meetings in May 1810 organised a petition for an open meeting – Cabildo Abierto
|-
| || The petition was refused by viceroy Baltasar Hidalgo de Cisneros but popular protest forced his hand on 22 May.
|-
| || The Cabildo opened its session on 22 May with 251 of the city's most prominent citizens, and discussed the future government of the provinces
|-
| || On 23 May the assembly voted for the removal of the viceroy and the creation of the Primera Junta of locals to govern Buenos Aires, proclaiming loyalty to Ferdinand VII. This was properly agreed and the Junta sworn in on 25 May
|-
| || Unsuccessful military campaigns in Paraguay and Alto Perú failed to gather support for joint action by the entire viceroyalty against Spanish forces (to 1811)
|-
| May || News of Napoleon's invasion of Spain caused a power vacuum in Buenos Aires leading to a series of events known as the May Revolution:
|-
| December || Junta Grande, with delegates from other provinces of the United Provinces of the River Plate, replaced Primera Junta
|-
| 1811 || || First Triumvirate of Feliciano Chiclana, Juan José Paso and Manuel de Sarratea replaced Junta Grande in September 1811
|-
| rowspan="2" valign="top" | 1812 || || The Jujuy Exodus of August 1812 was led by Manuel Belgrano, with several thousand soldiers and civilians retreating from Jujuy and Salta, to avoid military defeat and defections
|-
| || Second Triumvirate of Nicolás Rodriguez Peña, Antonio Álvarez Jonte and Juan José Paso replaced First Triumvirate
|-
| rowspan="2" valign="top" | 1813 || || The Battle of San Lorenzo in February, first battle of José de San Martín in the Argentine War of Independence
|-
| || The Asamblea del año XIII called in February to plan further military campaigns and organise defence of Buenos Aires
|-
| rowspan="2" valign="top" | 1814 || || Action of 14 May 1814 saw United Provinces' fleet defeat Spanish navy securing coast
|-
| || Second Triumvirate replaced by position of Supreme Director, first occupied by Gervasio Antonio de Posadas
|-
| 1815 || || Defeats in battles in late 1815 led to final loss of modern Bolivia
|-
| rowspan="2" valign="top" | 1816 || || In March an assembly of provincial delegates met as the Congress of Tucumán to discuss future military and political developments
|-
| || On 9 July 1816, the Congress declared the independence of Argentina
|-
| 1820 || || The Battle of Cepeda took place between Unitarians who supported a strong centralised state, and Federals, largely provincial caudillo warlords who wanted decentralised authority. The Federals won and the February 1820 Treaty of Pilar declared Argentina as a federal country, although Unitarian ideals continued
|-
| rowspan="2" valign="top" | 1825 || || The United Kingdom recognises Argentine independence.
|-
| || Deputies from the eastern bank of the Río de la Plata declare independence from Brazil, leading to the Cisplatine War. The 1827 Battle of Ituzaingó saw tactical success for Argentina. The war ended in 1828 with a treaty giving independence to Uruguay
|-
| 1828 || || Luis Vernet establishes settlement on the Falkland Islands
|-
| 1829 || || Juan Manuel de Rosas became governor of Buenos Aires Province
|-
| 1830 || || Yaghan aboriginal Jemmy Button (Orundellico) taken from Tierra del Fuego to England by Robert FitzRoy on 
|-
| rowspan="3" valign="top" | 1831 || || Pacto Federal signed between provinces to protect federal nature of country
|-
| || The Voyage of the Beagle with Charles Darwin and Robert FitzRoy visited the Río de la Plata, Patagonia and Tierra del Fuego (to 1834)
|-
| || Argentine Governor of the Falkland Islands Luis Vernet is expelled by  following his seizure of United States interests. New governor murdered in 1832 mutiny
|-
| rowspan="2" valign="top" | 1833 || || Juan Manuel de Rosas begins the First Conquest of the Desert
|-
| || British forces re-occupy the Falkland Islands
|-
| 1839 || || Rosas made Supreme Chief of the Argentine Confederation
|-
| 1852 || || Rosas overthrown by Justo José de Urquiza following Battle of Caseros
|-
| 1853 || || Constitution of Argentina agreed by assembly in Santa Fe, creating modern system of government
|-
| 1854 || || Urquiza became first President of Argentina in modern sense but opposed by Buenos Aires, still opposed to federal project
|-
| 1859 || || Defeat of Unitarian forces led by Bartolomé Mitre by Urquiza and federals at Battle of Cepeda; Buenos Aires re-enters confederation
|-
| 1861 || || Mendoza earthquake kills 8,000 to 10,000 citizens of Mendoza
|-
| 1864 || || Start of War of the Triple Alliance between Paraguay and the Triple Alliance of Argentina, Brazil and Uruguay, leading to utter defeat of Paraguay by 1870
|-
| 1878 || || Commencement of the Conquest of the Desert against indigenous inhabitants of the south led by Julio Argentino Roca; final surrender by 1884
|-
| 1880 || || Roca became president, finally defeated federals and moved capital to Buenos Aires from Rosario
|-
| 1884 || || Gold is discovered near Cape Virgenes sparking the Tierra del Fuego gold rush
|-
| rowspan="2" valign="top" | 1890 || || Founding of the Radical Civic Union (UCR) or Radical Party
|-
| || The Panic of 1890 brought the Baring Brothers bank in London close to collapse after disastrous investments in Argentina
|-
| 1895 || || Mandatory military service (Conscription) established
|}

 20th century 

 21st century 

See also
 Timeline of Buenos Aires history

 References 

López Levy, Marcela, 2004. We are Millions: Neo-liberalism and new forms of political action in Argentina, Latin America Bureau, London. 
Nouzeilles, Gabriela and Montaldo, Graciela (eds), 2002. The Argentina Reader: History, Culture, Politics'', Duke University Press, Durham and London. 

Argentine
[[Category:Argentina history-related lists